François Paul Étienne Azéma (15 January 1778 – 28 August 1851 in Saint-Denis, Réunion, on the island of Réunion) was a French poet, playwright, and writer of fables.  He was a magistrate, delegated to the island by the Ministre de la Marine, and as a writer was well known for his play Médée.  He was a descendant of Jean-Baptiste Azéma, a former governor of the island; he was the father of Georges Azéma, a historian, and Mazaé Azéma, a doctor.  His grandson was the doctor Henri Azéma; other descendants include the poet Jean-Henri Azéma and the historian Jean-Pierre Azéma. He was made Chevalier of the Legion of Honour in 1850.

References

Digitized version of his work

People of French descent from Réunion
Writers from Réunion
Poets from Réunion
19th-century French dramatists and playwrights
People from Saint-Denis, Réunion
1776 births
1851 deaths
19th-century French poets
French fabulists
Dramatists and playwrights from Réunion